Wendy Irene Baltzer is an American veterinarian, small animal surgeon and academic.

Academic career 
Baltzer was educated at the University of California, Davis where she completed a Doctor of Veterinary Medicine in 1994. Following a PhD at Texas A&M University in 2003, she was employed as associate professor at Oregon State University where she specialised in small animal surgery from 2005 to 2016. She then moved to New Zealand to take up a position at Massey University where she was appointed full professor in November 2019, with effect from 1 January 2020. She practised at Massey's Working Dog Centre, focusing on sporting dogs' injuries, orthopaedics and rehabilitation. 

In 2020 Baltzer transferred to the University of Sydney School of Veterinary Science, where she is associate professor as well as head of surgery at the University Veterinary Teaching Hospital Sydney.

Selected works

References

External links 

 

Living people
Year of birth missing (living people)
University of California, Davis alumni
Texas A&M University alumni
American veterinarians
Oregon State University faculty
Academic staff of the Massey University
Academic staff of the University of Sydney
American emigrants to Australia